Sherman Farm is a historic home and farm complex located at Pittstown Rensselaer County, New York.  The complex includes the main house and seven contributing outbuildings.  They are a hay barn, wagon barn, corn house, hog bar, ice house, and a barn attached to the hay barn.  All were built in the late-18th or early-19th century.  the main house was built about 1797 and is a two-story, rectangular frame house with a full attic, full cellar, and high pitched gable roof in the Federal style.  A major remodeling about 1840 added some Greek Revival details.

It was listed on the National Register of Historic Places in 2003.

References

Houses on the National Register of Historic Places in New York (state)
Federal architecture in New York (state)
Houses completed in 1797
Houses in Rensselaer County, New York
National Register of Historic Places in Rensselaer County, New York